Else Ammann (17 May 1923 – 23 January 2018) was a German cross-country skier. She competed in the women's 10 kilometres and the women's 3 × 5 kilometre relay events at the 1956 Winter Olympics.

Cross-country skiing results

Olympic Games

References

External links
 

1923 births
2018 deaths
German female cross-country skiers
Olympic cross-country skiers of the United Team of Germany
Cross-country skiers at the 1956 Winter Olympics
People from Oberallgäu
Sportspeople from Swabia (Bavaria)